Christofer Stevenson (born 25 April 1982) is a Swedish former professional cyclist.

Major results

2000
 1st  Road race, National Junior Road Championships
2004
 3rd Road race, National Road Championships
2005
 1st Scandinavian Open Road Race
 2nd Road race, National Road Championships
 5th Tartu GP
2006
 2nd Road race, National Road Championships
2008
 1st Overall Tour du Loir-et-Cher
 3rd Overall Tour de Normandie
2009
 2nd Scandinavian Race Uppsala
 4th Overall Olympia's Tour
1st Stage 3
 7th Overall Tour du Loir-et-Cher
 8th Philadelphia International Championship
2010
 7th Scandinavian Race Uppsala
2011
 4th GP Herning
 4th Rogaland GP
2012
 1st  Road race, National Road Championships
2015
 4th Scandinavian Race Uppsala

References

External links

1982 births
Living people
Swedish male cyclists
Sportspeople from Gothenburg